The Cage is a pulp-era novel by British author Sydney Horler.  It was published in 1953 by Robert Hale.

Plot
A young woman, Virginia Hoyle, moves from her provincial town to London after winning a local beauty contest.  A reporter from her home town, Jim Norris, with whom she was friends, likewise moves to London where he obtains a job as a newspaper reporter on Fleet Street.  Virginia is soon targeted by several parties involved in the 'White Slave' industry and is kidnapped.  Norris follows a trail of leads and is eventually able to secure Virginia's freedom.

Pulp fiction
1953 British novels
Novels set in London
British thriller novels
Novels by Sydney Horler
Robert Hale books